John Cottam (born 5 June 1950, Warsop) was an English professional footballer who played as a defender. He played in The Football League for five clubs and later became a manager in non–league football.

Playing career
Cottam began his career with Nottingham Forest, whom he signed professional forms with in April 1968. He made his debut in the 1970–71 season when the club were in The First Division. Apart from loan spells with Mansfield Town and Lincoln City, Cottam remained at Forest until August 1976, making nearly 100 league appearances in the process.

Cottam then moved on to Chesterfield, where he played regularly for three years in Division Three. In July 1979 he moved to divisional rivals Chester for £12,500, making his debut in a Football League Cup tie against Walsall the following month. In his first season, he missed just one of Chester's 58 first-team games and helped the Blues reach the FA Cup fifth round. He remained a regular for the next two years with Trevor Storton his regular defensive partner.

Ahead of the 1982–83 season, Cottam moved to Alliance Premier League side Scarborough as player–manager, taking Chester players David Burns and Brynley Jones with him. His first season saw the club finish as runners–up in the Bob Lord Trophy, with the Seadogs going on to win the competition the following season. However, Cottam was sacked in November 1984, shortly after an FA Cup defeat to Tow Law Town.

After Playing career
After a spell playing for Burton Albion, Cottam joined the Metropolitan Police force in July 1985, becoming a police sergeant. He began playing for the Metropolitan Police in the Isthmian League. He played for three years and then became coach at the start of the 1992–93 season. Cottam became club manager in 1995 for two years.

John now works for Chelsea Football Club in Security as their Compliance Officer.

Honours

Scarborough

Bob Lord Trophy: Winners 1983–84; runners-up 1982–83.

External links
Nottingham Forest 'Where are they now' feature
Scarborough FC managers list

Bibliography

References

1950 births
Living people
English Football League players
National League (English football) players
Association football defenders
Nottingham Forest F.C. players
Mansfield Town F.C. players
Lincoln City F.C. players
Chesterfield F.C. players
Chester City F.C. players
Scarborough F.C. players
Burton Albion F.C. players
Metropolitan Police F.C. players
English football managers
Scarborough F.C. managers
Metropolitan Police F.C. managers
Metropolitan Police officers
People from Warsop
Footballers from Nottinghamshire
English footballers